The American International Consortium of Academic Libraries (AMICAL) is an association of 28 American-style universities located in 20 countries. It was founded in 2004 by the American University of Paris, with support from the Andrew W. Mellon Foundation.

Members
Al Akhawayn University in Ifrane (Ifrane, Morocco)
American Academy in Rome (Rome, Italy)
American College of Greece (Deree) (Athens, Greece)
American College of Thessaloniki (Thessaloniki, Greece)
American University in Bulgaria (Blagoevgrad, Bulgaria)
American University in Cairo (New Cairo, Egypt)
American University of Armenia (Yerevan, Armenia)
American University of Beirut (Beirut, Lebanon)
American University of Central Asia (Bishkek, Kyrgyzstan)
American University of Iraq, Sulaimani (Sulaimani, Iraq)
American University of Kuwait (Kuwait City, Kuwait)
American University of Nigeria (Yola, Nigeria)
American University of Paris (Paris, France)
American University of Rome (Rome, Italy)
American University of Sharjah (Sharjah, United Arab Emirates)
Ashesi University (Berekuso, Ghana)
Central European University (Budapest, Hungary)
Effat University (Jeddah, Saudi Arabia)
Forman Christian College (Lahore, Pakistan)
Franklin University Switzerland (Lugano, Switzerland)
Habib University (Karachi, Pakistan)
Haigazian University (Beirut, Lebanon)
IAU College (Aix-en-Provence, France)
John Cabot University (Rome, Italy)
Lebanese American University (Beirut, Lebanon)
Saint Louis University Madrid Campus (Madrid, Spain)
University of Central Asia (Bishkek, Kyrgyzstan)

External links
Official website

Notes

International college and university associations and consortia
Library consortia